Paulo de Pitta e Cunha (27 February 1937 – 8 September 2022) was a Portuguese lawyer, professor, and politician. A member of the Social Democratic Party, he served in the Assembly of the Republic from 1976 to 1980.

Pitta died on 8 September 2022, at the age of 85.

References

1937 births
2022 deaths
People from Lisbon
Portuguese lawyers
Portuguese educators
Social Democratic Party (Portugal) politicians
Members of the Assembly of the Republic (Portugal)
20th-century Portuguese politicians
Grand Crosses of the Order of Prince Henry